Daniel Ahumada Gaete (born 2 February 1960) is a Chilean former footballer.

References

1960 births
Living people
Association football defenders
Chilean footballers
Olympic footballers of Chile
Footballers at the 1984 Summer Olympics